This is a list of holidays in Equatorial Guinea.

January 1: New Year's Day
Good Friday
May 1: Labour Day
May 30: Feast of Corpus Christi
June 5: President's Day, birthday of President Teodoro Obiang Nguema Mbasogo.
August 3: Freedom Day, marks the date in 1979 when Teodoro Obiang deposed the dictator Macías Nguema.
August 15: Constitution Day, honors the Constitution of 1982.
October 12: Independence Day, from Spain, 1968.
December 8: Immaculate Conception, Roman Catholic feast day.
December 25: Christmas Day

References 

Events in Equatorial Guinea
Equatorial Guinea
Equatorial Guinea